Paul-Pierre Roux, called Saint-Pol-Roux (15 January 1861, quartier de Saint-Henry, Marseille - 18 October 1940, Brest) was a French Symbolist poet.

Life

Marseille 
Saint-Pol-Roux was born to a middle-class family in Marseille, where his father was an industrialist. He studied in a lycée in Lyon, and left it as Bachelor of Arts in 1880. He then wrote some plays under his own name.

Years in Paris 
He left the south of France to install himself in Paris. He particularly frequented the salon of Stéphane Mallarmé, for whom Saint-Pol-Roux had the greatest admiration. He won a certain notoriety, trying out several pseudonyms before finally becoming "Saint-Pol-Roux le magnifique". One of his plays, La Dame à la faulx, was put on by Sarah Bernhardt, and was interviewed by Jules Huret as a member of the Symbolist movement. He perhaps participated in the Rosicrucian aesthetic of Péladan. Nevertheless, he wrote nothing on the movement or on its founder although Saint-Pol-Roux seems to have been interested in this audacious literary attempt.

Voluntary exile 
Saint-Pol-Roux leaves Paris in 1898, having come to hate it for his being ostracized, and for the mediocrity of the literary criticism circles, ignoring it with as much pride as he himself had been ignored. On a clairvoyant's advice, and also to escape his creditors, he left, firstly for the Ardennes. There he settled with his wife in Roscanvel, in  Finistère, where their daughter Divine was born. After his father's death, he moved to Camaret and made Brittany the center for his work.

Living off the revenue he earned from his libretto for the opera Louise, he bought a house overlooking the ocean, above the Pen Had beach, on the road to pointe de Pen Hir. He transformed it into a manor in the Baroque style. He named it the ”Manoir de Coecilian”, after his son's name, or sometimes ”Manoir des Boultous”. He wrote "Facing the sea, man is closer to God" ("Face à la mer, l'homme est plus près de Dieu"). He welcomed several artists and writers at the manor, notably Louis-Ferdinand Céline, who looked up to him as an ancestor, and even Jean Moulin, then ”sous-préfet de Châteaulin”, who visited in 1930.

Saint-Pol-Roux was a member of the académie Mallarmé from 1937 to 1940.

Death 
 The Crozon peninsula was occupied by German troops in the Battle of France. A drunken German soldier invaded the manor during the night of 22 to 23 June 1940. He killed the family's faithful governess Rose with several gun shots and wounded Saint-Pol-Roux's daughter Divine with a bullet. It is often said that the soldier also raped Divine, something she later refuted. Saint-Pol-Roux was wounded, but managed to survive the tragedy, as the German soldier fled, frightened by the house dog. The case greatly embarrassed the German military authorities. German military authorities arrested the culprit already on 23 June 1940. He was tried by the German court martial in Brest, sentenced to death and executed.

Divine was taken to a hospital in Brest, where she was treated until 15 April 1941. Saint-Pol-Roux was deeply affected by the death of Rose, the injuries of his daughter and the blows he had received. While commuting between the hospital in Brest and Camaret he learned that the mansion had been visited again. The mansion was looted on 3 October 1940. The various rooms of the manor, in particular its bedroom and its study, were in great disorder. Manuscripts of several works on which that Saint-Pol-Roux had been working on for several years had been torn or burned.

When he saw the disaster, he understood that it would be impossible for him to reconstruct his work and felt an immense despair. Saint-Pol-Roux suffered an uremic crisis and was transported to the hospital in Brest on 13 October 1940. He died on 18 October 1940. Louis Aragon published an article on the "assassination" of Saint-Pol-Roux, as he called it. The article was called "Saint-Pol Roux, ou L'Espoir" and published in the 
journal Poésie a month after the death of Saint-Pol-Roux. It was the first article published by Aragon after the fall of France, and was censored by the Vichy authorities. 

The manor was occupied by the German military during war. The manor was used by the Marine Flak Abteilung 804 as a command center. The unit was dedicated to coastal anti-aircraft defense. And the German army eventually installed two French Lahitolle 95 mm cannons at the gates of the manor. The manor was bombed several times by Allied airforces and eventually burned down on 11 October 1944, only seven days before the liberation of Camaret.

A forgotten poet 
On the Liberation, Divine tried in vain to ensure that her father's work was not forgotten.  It is in large part due to the salvage work, editing and publication of editions of his work by Rougerie during those years, which she called "purgatory", that his poems, essays and plays that had escaped Nazi barbarism were edited and re-edited anew.  A considerable number of unedited manuscripts (Le Trésor de l'Homme, La Répoétique) survived the pillaging.

Saint-Pol-Roux is the archetypal "forgotten poet".  It was under this title that he was a dedicatee of André Breton's Clair de Terre (also dedicated to "ceux qui comme lui s'offrent le magnifique plaisir de se faire oublier (sic)", or "those who like him offered themselves the great pleasure of making themselves forgotten"), and Vercors's Le Silence de la mer (calling him "le poète assassiné", or "the assassinated poet").

Corpus 
Saint-Pol-Roux attempted to create a total work of art.  This dream of Symbolist literature consisted of creating a perfect work responding to all the senses.  Saint-Pol-Roux himself was therefore very interested in plays and operas during his Parisian years.  At the end of his life,  he marvelled at the artistic possibilities offered by the cinema.

Saint-Pol-Roux equally created the notion of "idéoréalisme".  He desired an artistic fusion between the real world and the world of ideas in a Neoplatonic perspective.  He imagined a cosmology in which Beauty - lost in the real world - has to be revealed by the poet.

Works 
Under the name Paul Roux
 Maman!, Ollendorff, 1883
 Garçon d'honneur, Ollendorff, 1883
 Le Poète, Ghio, 1883
 Un drôle de mort, Ghio, 1884
 Rêve de duchesse, Ghio, 1884
 La Ferme, Ghio, 1886
Under the name Saint-Pol-Roux
 Les Reposoirs de la procession, vol 1., Mercure de France, 1893
 L'Épilogue des saisons humaines, Mercure de France 1893
 La Dame à la faux, Mercure de France, 1899
 Les Reposoirs de la procession, vol. I : La Rose et les épines du chemin, Mercure de France, 1901
 Anciennetés, Mercure de France, 1903
 Les Reposoirs de la procession, vol. II : De la colombe au corbeau par le paon, Mercure de France, 1904
 Les Reposoirs de la procession, vol. III : Les Féeries intérieures, Mercure de France, 1907
 Les Fééries intérieures, 1907
 La Mort du Berger, Broulet, Brest, 1938, 69 p.
 La Supplique du Christ, 1939.
Posthumously published
 Bretagne est Univers, Broulet, Brest, 1941
 Florilège Saint-Pol-Roux, L'Amitié par le Livre, 1943
 Anciennetés, Seuil, 1946
 L'Ancienne à la coiffe innombrable, Éd. du Fleuve, Nantes, 1946
 Août, Broder, 1958
 Saint-Pol-Roux "Les plus belles pages", Mercure de France, 1966
 Le Trésor de l'homme, Rougerie, Mortemart, 1970
 La Répoétique, Rougerie, Mortemart, 1971
 Cinéma vivant, Rougerie, Mortemart, 1972
 Vitesse, Rougerie, Mortemart, 1973
 Les Traditions de l'avenir, Rougerie, Mortemart, 1974
 Saint-Pol-Roux / Victor Segalen, Correspondance, Rougerie, Mortemart, 1975
 La Transfiguration de la guerre, Rougerie, Mortemart, 1976
 Genèses, Rougerie, Mortemart, 1976
 La Randonnée, Rougerie, Mortemart, 1977
 De l'art magnifique, Rougerie, Mortemart, 1978
 La Dame à la faulx, Rougerie, Mortemart, 1979
 Les Reposoirs de la procession, vol. I : La Rose et les épines du chemin, Rougerie, Mortemart, 1980
 Les Reposoirs de la procession, vol. II : De la colombe au corbeau par le paon, Rougerie, Mortemart, 1980
 Les Reposoirs de la procession, vol. III : Les Féeries intérieures, Rougerie, Mortemart, 1981
 Le Tragique dans l'homme, vol. I : Les Personnages de l'individu, Les Saisons humaines, Tristan la Vie, Rougerie, Mortemart, 1983
 Le Tragique dans l'homme, vol. II : Monodrames, L'Âme noire du prieur blanc, Fumier, Rougerie, Mortemart, 1984
 Tablettes. 1885-1895, Rougerie, Mortemart, 1986
 Idéoréalités. 1895-1914, Rougerie, Mortemart, 1987
 Glorifications. 1914-1930, Rougerie, Mortemart, 1992
 Vendanges, Rougerie, Mortemart, 1993
 La Besace du solitaire, Rougerie, Mortemart, 2000 
 Les Ombres tutélaires, Rougerie, Mortemart, 2005

Bibliography

References

External links 

 Blog dedicated to Saint-Pol-Roux 

1861 births
1940 deaths
Writers from Marseille
19th-century French poets
Symbolist artists
French male poets
20th-century French poets